(San) Isidro or (San) Ysidro may refer to:

People

Saints
Saint Isidore the Laborer (c. 1070 – died 1130), the patron saint of farmers of Madrid (Spain) and La Ceiba (Honduras)
Saint Isidore of Seville (c. 560 – died 636), scholar and Archbishop of Seville

Given name
Isidro Ancheta (1882–1946), Filipino landscape painter
Isidro Ayora (1879–1978), Ecuadorian politician
Isidro Barradas, Spanish general sent to Mexico in 1829
Isidro de Alaix Fábregas, Count of Vergara and Viscount of Villarrobledo (1790-1853), Spanish general of the First Carlist War
Isidro del Prado (born 1959), Filipino sprinter
Isidro Díaz González (born 1954), Spanish retired professional footballer
Isidro Díaz (footballer, born 1972), Spanish footballer
Isidro Fabela (1882–1964), Mexican judge, politician, professor, writer, publisher and governor of the State of Mexico
Isidro Fabré (1895–?), Cuban baseball pitcher
Isidro García (boxer) (born 1976), Mexican boxer
Isidro Goma y Tomas (1869–1940), Spanish Bishop, Cardinal and Archbishop
Isidro González (1907–?), Spanish fencer
Isidro Gutiérrez (born 1989), Salvadoran footballer
Isidro A. Negrón Irizarry (born 1956), Puerto Rican politician
Isidro Lángara (1912—1992), Spanish footballer
Isidro Márquez (born 1965), Mexican Major League Baseball pitcher
Isidro Montoya (born 1990), Colombian sprinter
Isidro Mosquea (born 1976), boxer from the Dominican Republic
Isidro Nozal (born 1977), former Spanish professional road racing cyclist
Isidro Pedraza Chávez (born 1959), Mexican politician
Isidro Rico (born 1961), Mexican marathon runner
Isidro Salusky, American nephrologist
Isidro Ungab (born 1961), Filipino politician

Surname
Agot Isidro (born 1966), Filipina actress
Orlanda Velez Isidro (born 1972), Portuguese soprano
Pedro Isidro (born 1985), Portuguese race walker

Places

Argentina
San Isidro, Buenos Aires, a municipality in the Greater Buenos Aires area
San Isidro Partido, a partido of the province of Buenos Aires
San Isidro, Catamarca, a town in the Catamarca Province
San Isidro, San Juan, head town of the San Martín department in the San Juan Province
San Isidro de Iruya, a village in Salta Province

Belize
San Isidro, Belize, a village in Toledo District

Costa Rica
San Isidro de Heredia, the capital of the canton of San Isidro, Heredia province
San Isidro de El General, a district in the canton of Pérez Zeledón, San José province
San Isidro District, Alajuela, in the canton of Alajuela, Alajuela province
San Isidro District, Atenas, in the canton of Atenas, Alajuela province
San Isidro District, El Guarco, in the canton of El Guarco, Cartago province
San Isidro District, Grecia, in the canton of Grecia, Alajuela province
San Isidro District, León Cortés, in the canton of León Cortés, San José province
San Isidro District, Montes de Oro, in the canton of Montes de Oro, Puntarenas province
San Isidro District, San Isidro, in the canton of San Isidro, Heredia province
San Isidro District, San Ramón, in the canton of San Ramón, Alajuela province
San Isidro District, Vásquez de Coronado, in the canton of Vásquez de Coronado, San José province

Dominican Republic
San Isidro Air Base, an air base 25 km east of Santo Domingo

El Salvador
San Isidro, Morazán, a municipality in the Morazán Department
San Isidro Labrador, Chalatenango, a municipality in the Chalatenango Department
San Isidro, a municipality in the Cabañas Department
San Isidro (river), San Isidro, Cabañas

Guatemala
San Isidro, Guatemala, a locality in Guatemala City

Honduras
San Isidro, Choluteca, a municipality in the Choluteca department

Mexico
San Isidro, Baja California Sur, a city in the state of Baja California Sur
San Isidro, Chiapas, a locality in the municipality of Pijijiapan
San Isidro, Chihuahua, a locality in the municipality of Juárez
San Isidro, Jalisco, a city in the state of Jalisco
San Isidro, Michoacán, a city in the state of Michoacán

Nicaragua
San Isidro, Matagalpa, a municipality in the Matagalpa department

Peru
San Isidro District, Lima, a district in the Lima province
San Isidro District, Huaytará, a district in the Huaytará province
San Isidro de Maino District, a district in the Chachapoyas province

Philippines
San Isidro, Abra, a municipality in the province of Abra
San Isidro, Bohol, a municipality in the province of Bohol
San Isidro, Davao del Norte, a municipality in the province of Davao del Norte
San Isidro, Davao Oriental, a municipality in the province of Davao Oriental
San Isidro, Isabela, a municipality in the province of Isabela
San Isidro, Leyte, a municipality in the province of Leyte
San Isidro, Northern Samar, a municipality in the province of Northern Samar
San Isidro, Nueva Ecija, a municipality in the province of Nueva Ecija
San Isidro, Lupao, Nueva Ecija, a barangay in the municipality of Lupao, Nueva Ecija
San Isidro, a barangay of the municipality of Rodriguez in the Rizal province
San Isidro, Parañaque
San Isidro, Surigao del Norte, a municipality on Siargao Island in the province of Surigao del Norte
San Isidro, San Pablo, a barangay of San Pablo City in the Laguna province
San Isidro, Makati (Barangay), an area in the Makati Poblacion in the Manila metropolitan area
San Isidro, Tagbilaran City, a barangay of Tagbilaran in the Bohol province
San Isidro, Bohol (barangay), a barangay of Ubay, in the province of Bohol
San Isidro, Cabuyao, a barangay of Cabuyao in the province of Laguna
San Isidro, Macabebe, a barangay of Macabebe in the province of Pampanga

Portugal
Santo Isidro de Pegões, a parish in the Montijo municipality in the Setúbal district

Puerto Rico
 San Isidro, Culebra, Puerto Rico, a barrio in the island-municipality of Culebras

Spain
San Isidro, Alicante, a village in the province of Alicante
 San Isidro, a town in the municipality of Granadilla de Abona, Tenerife, Canary Islands
 San Isidro (Madrid), a ward (barrio) of Madrid, named after the patron saint of Madrid

United States

Old Gilroy, California, formerly San Isidro, an unincorporated community in Santa Clara County, California
San Ysidro, San Diego, a district in the city of San Diego, California
San Ysidro District AVA, a Californian wine region in Santa Clara County
San Ysidro Ranch, a ranch in Santa Barbara County, California
San Ysidro, Doña Ana County, New Mexico, a place in Doña Ana County, New Mexico
San Ysidro, New Mexico, a village in Sandoval County, New Mexico
San Isidro, Texas, a place in Starr County, Texas

Sports
A.D. Isidro Metapán, a Salvadoran football club based in Metapán, El Salvador
C.D. Águila San Isidro, a Salvadoran football club based near Chinameca, San Miguel
CD Betis San Isidro, a Spanish football club based in Madrid
CD San Isidro, a Spanish football team based in San Isidro, Canary Islands
Club Atlético San Isidro (CASI), an Argentinian multi-sports club based in San Isidro, Buenos Aires
Club Náutico San Isidro, a sailing club based in San Isidro, Buenos Aires
San Isidro Club (SIC), an Argentinian multi-sports club based in Boulogne Sur Mer, Buenos Aires

Other uses
Iglesia San Isidro Labrador y Santa María de la Cabeza, an 1844 Spanish Colonial building in Sabana Grande, Puerto Rico
Instituto San Isidro, an historic school in Madrid, Spain
Nuestra Señora de los Dolores y San Isidro Labrador, Libertad, a Roman Catholic parish church in Libertad, San José Department, Uruguay
San Isidro Church, Madrid, a baroque church in central Madrid, Spain, which holds the relics of Isidore the Laborer
San Isidro Movement, a Cuban dissident group
San Isidro (Panama Metro), a rapid transit station in Panama City
San Ysidro Ranch, a hotel and resort near Santa Barbara, California

See also
 Isidro
 St. Isidore (disambiguation)